Lorena Castillo García de Varela (born July 31, 1968) is a Panamanian journalist and politician. She has served as the First Lady of Panama since July 1, 2014, to July 1, 2019, during the tenure of her husband, President Juan Carlos Varela.

Early life
Castillo was born on July 31, 1968, in Panama City to parents, Manuel J. Castillo and Moty Garcia. She married Juan Carlos Varela in 1992.

Castillo attended the Flint Hill School in Oakton, Virginia in the United States. She received her bachelor's degree in journalism from the Latin American University of Science and Technology (ULACIT). She worked as a journalist at several organizations, including Telemetro. In 2012, she left journalism to focus on her husband's political career.

First lady
Lorena Castillo became First Lady of Panama on 1 July 2014. On November 16, 2015, Castillo was appointed a "Special Advocate for AIDS in Latin America" by UNAIDS executive director Michel Sidibé during a ceremony at the Palacio de las Garzas.

References

|-

Living people
1968 births
First ladies and gentlemen of Panama
Panamanian journalists
Panamanian women writers
Panamanian women journalists
Panameñista Party politicians
People from Panama City
20th-century Panamanian women writers
20th-century Panamanian writers
21st-century Panamanian women writers
21st-century Panamanian writers